William Dewey Foster  (1890 – 1958) was an American architect.

Foster received his training from the Massachusetts Institute of Technology.  During the 1910s and 1920s, he worked as a draftsman for a number of architectural firms before going into private practice.  In 1934 he, along with 20 other architects, were hired on a consultatory basis by the Office of the Supervising Architect to help with the increased workload of New Deal projects.  During his eight-year tenure with the Office he designed a number of post office buildings located in the New York City area.  He also designed the Weather Bureau (1940) and State Department (1942) offices.

Project involvement
 U.S. Post Office-Knickerbocker Station, New York, New York, 1935-1937
 United States Post Office (Morrisania, Bronx), Bronx, New York, 1936
 U.S. Post Office (Larchmont, New York), Larchmont, New York, 1937
 United States Post Office (Rockville Centre, New York), Rockville Centre, New York, 1937
 Harry S Truman Building, Washington, D.C., 1938-1939
 United States Post Office (Great Neck, New York), Great Neck, New York, 1939–40

References

1890 births
1958 deaths
20th-century American architects
Massachusetts Institute of Technology alumni